

The Lefebvre MP.205 Busard (French: "Harrier") was a single-seat racing aircraft built in France in 1975 and marketed for homebuilding. Its design was adapted from that of the Lefebvre MP-204 'Busard' racer (itself derived from the Max Plan PF.204 Busard), that had been conceived to attempt a world airspeed record in the under 500 kg class in 1949. Compared to its predecessor, the Busard was lightened and intended to be powered by a lower-power engine, and simplified for construction by amateurs. Indeed, the prototype was built by the designer with assistance from students at the Albert Camus technical school of Rouen. Like the MP.204 that it was based on, the Busard was a streamlined, low-wing, cantilever monoplane of conventional design with fixed, tricycle undercarriage. Provision was made for the use of either an aero engine, or a Volkswagen automotive engine.

Variants
Lefebvre MP-204 'Busard'
Derived from the PF.204 by Robert Lefebvre, powered by a  Continental A65 4-cyl. horizontally-opposed piston engine.
Lefebvre MP-205 'Busard'
Derivative of the MP-204, powered by a  Continental C90 4-cyl. horizontally-opposed piston engine.

Specifications (MP-205 'Busard')

References
 
 
 aviafrance.com

1970s French sport aircraft
Homebuilt aircraft
Low-wing aircraft
Aircraft first flown in 1975